Laelaptoseius is a monotypic genus of mites in the family Ascidae, endemic to New Zealand. The sole species is Laelaptoseius novaezelandiae.

References

Acari genera
Acari of New Zealand
Ascidae
Monotypic arachnid genera